A timeline of events related to migrant children's detention centers in the United States

A selected timeline of events

See also
Trump administration family separation policy 
 Casa Padre
 Casa San Diego
 Prison–industrial complex

Notes

References related to Flores

References

External links 

2010s controversies in the United States
2018 controversies in the United States
Illegal immigration to the United States
Anti-immigration politics in the United States
Immigration policy of Donald Trump
United States Department of Health and Human Services
United States Department of Homeland Security
Human rights abuses in the United States
Social history of the United States
Immigration detention centers and prisons in the United States